The Iranian ambassador in Bern is the official representative of the Government in Tehran to the Government of Switzerland.

List of representatives

See also
List of ambassadors to Switzerland

References 

 
Switzerland
Iran